The NHRA Camping World Drag Racing Series is a drag racing series organized by the National Hot Rod Association (NHRA). It is the top competition series of the NHRA, comprising competition in four classes, including Top Fuel Dragster, Funny Car, Pro Stock, and Pro Stock Motorcycle.

The champion of each category is determined by a point system where points are given according to finishing placement and qualifying effort. The season is divided into two segments. After the first 18 races, the Top 10 of each pro category are locked in and compete in the last six races with the difference in points greatly minimized.

History
The series has four main professional classes:  Top Fuel Dragster, Funny Car, Pro Stock, and Pro Stock Motorcycle. Top Fuel was the first category, with Funny Cars added in 1966, Pro Stock four years later and Pro Stock Motorcycles in 1987. Both Top Fuel and Funny Cars regularly see top speeds in excess of  today, and one thousand foot times anywhere from 3.70 to 4 seconds. Both these cars burn fuel consisting of 90% nitromethane and 10% methanol. Top Fuel (class designation:  AA/D top fuel dragster) and Fuel Funny Car (class designation: AA/FC top fuel coupe) have recently been limited to a   track, instead of the historic 1/4 mile [], as a means to limit top speeds and increase safety (there had been a number of engine explosions at or near 300 mph resulting in driver injuries and death). Currently, driver and spectator safety has been enhanced even while top speeds often approach and exceed 300 mph.

Some of the popular racers to come through the series include "Big Daddy" Don Garlits, Don "The Snake" Prudhomme, and Shirley Muldowney.  Those three gained much attention from the 1960s through 1970s with their speed and personalities, a combination rarely achieved today through the political correctness of sponsorship in today's drivers.  Nonetheless there are still colorful characters today, such as 16-time Funny Car world champion John Force. His daughter, 2007 Rookie of the Year Ashley Force Hood has made appearances on Good Morning America and The Tonight Show and was voted AOL's Hottest Female Athlete in 2007.

On July 2, 2008, following the death of Funny Car driver Scott Kalitta, the NHRA announced that race distances for Top Fuel and Funny Car classes would temporarily be reduced to 1,000 ft from the traditional 1/4 mile (1320 ft). The measure was intended to be temporary while safety solutions were explored; however, the races have remained at 1000 feet since Kalitta's death. Although unpopular with the fans, the distance remains at 1,000 feet today at the request of the teams as a cost-saving measure, with no indication by NHRA officials of any intent of returning to the full quarter-mile format any time soon. By late 2012, 1,000 foot racing became globally recognized as the 2012 FIA European title in Top Fuel became 1,000-foot championships, as Santa Pod and Hockenheim (the last two quarter-mile nitro strips) made the switch, and Australian nitro racing switched to the 1,000-foot distance only for selected tracks.

The Countdown
Since 2007, the NHRA implements a playoff system to determine the champion in each class, billed as the Countdown to The Championship. Each season is divided into two segments of races, with the bulk of the races making up the first segment, and the final events making up the second segment. After the first segment is complete, the drivers in each class at or above the cutoff point in the standings (8th place up to 2007 and 10th place thereafter) become eligible for the championship, while the drivers below the cutoff point are eliminated from championship contention, though they still participate in the remaining race events. The points for the advancing drivers are readjusted so that they are separated by a fixed margin, with first place receiving bonus points. The drivers then compete for the championship over the final races of the season.

The NHRA suspended the format for the 2020 season after originally rewarding all teams that attempted to make two qualifying passes per race during the regular season a bonus of automatic qualification as a reward for making all races when the COVID-19 pandemic resulted in five races being removed from the schedule. The format returned for the following season.

Title sponsors 

Winston cigarettes was the title sponsor of the series from 1975 until 2001, when a condition of the Master Settlement Agreement required Winston to drop either its sponsorship of the NHRA, or the NASCAR Winston Cup Series; Winston chose to retain its NASCAR sponsorship. Winston ended their sponsorship with NASCAR two years later.

The Coca-Cola Company took over title sponsorship in 2002. Until 2008, the series was branded with the company's Powerade sports drink brand. In 2009 the company changed the branding to promote its Full Throttle energy drink brand. In 2013, following Coca-Cola's most recent extension of its sponsorship, the title sponsor was changed to its citrus soda brand Mello Yello. With Mello Yello having introduced a new logo, the NHRA unveiled a new logo for the series in January 2016, as well as a new "My NHRA" marketing campaign that plays upon the logo to feature drivers and other personalities discussing what the NHRA means to them.

On September 20, 2020, Coca-Cola announced that, even though their most recent agreement with the NHRA was in effect until 2023, they would be immediately pulling their sponsorship from the sport. The NHRA responded by filing a lawsuit as it looked for a new title sponsor for its premier series. On October 4, 2020, the NHRA announced a new sponsorship deal with Camping World.

Champions

Before 1974, the season champion was determined by the winner of the World Finals event. The Professional categories contain the divisions of Top Fuel, Funny Car, Pro Stock (Automobile), and Pro Stock Motorcycle.

By driver

Broadcasting 
NHRA events have been broadcast on television, with such efforts dating back as far as 1983. By the 1990s, events were split between ESPN, NBC, and The Nashville Network, all produced by Diamond P Sports. TNN also broadcast a weekly highlight program, NHRA Today. Due to logistical and scheduling issues, including the possibility of long turnaround times between heats, weather delays, and other factors, events were typically broadcast in a condensed form via tape delay.  From 1992 until 2000, TNN carried live coverage of selected final rounds, typically with a condensed package to air until the finals began.

In 2001, the NHRA entered into an agreement with ESPN for it to become the exclusive broadcaster of NHRA events, shortly after MTV Networks had effectively shut down the CBS motorsport operations after its acquisition of CBS Cable, and the demise of TNN. During its 14-year stint as rightsholder, ESPN faced criticism for the structure and scheduling of its coverage. Due to scheduling conflicts with other sports properties to which it held rights, ESPN typically broadcast its NHRA coverage in inconsistent and otherwise undesirable timeslots. In the final years of the contract, the NHRA attempted to structure selected events so that they could be televised live; by the 2015 season, at least six events were broadcast live using the TNN model from 1992-2000.

In July 2015, ESPN and the NHRA agreed to end their contract one year early, with the association citing ESPN's scheduling issues as a concern. In turn, the NHRA announced a new television deal with Fox Sports beginning in the 2016 season. Coverage primarily airs on the FS1 and FS2 cable channels, while 4 events per-season are aired on the Fox broadcast network (including the flagship U.S. Nationals). Fox committed to televising live Sunday coverage from at least 16 of the 23 events per-season, two-hour qualification broadcasts and encores (including the condensed highlights program NHRA in 30), and coverage of selected Sportsman Series events. NHRA president Peter Clifford explained that the deal would be a "game-changer" for the association, citing Fox's history of motorsports coverage (such as NASCAR), as well as its commitment to increased coverage of NHRA events, including live network television coverage.

During the first two years of the contract, Fox had achieved an average viewership of 600,000 viewers—a major increase over ESPN's broadcasts. Some events had attracted an audience of over 1 million. The association's chief content officer Ken Adelson cited favorable scheduling practices (including better time slots and additional encores, as well as using NASCAR broadcasts as a lead-in), and increased promotion of the event broadcasts as part of FS1 and FS2's programming, as having helped build their audience.

The NHRA renewed its contract with Fox in 2021, and while expanding network television coverage, the contract involves more tape-delayed races during the Fox half of the NASCAR season to not conflict with NASCAR Cup Series events, designed to air after the conclusion of such events from February until June), and a split broadcast race that airs at live at 2 PM ET or delayed at 5 PM depending on market during the NFL season on a Fox NFL single-game weekend.

Notes

References

External links
 Official website
 Official NHRA Drag Racing Podcasts
 Drag Race Central The Latest NHRA News and Analysis

 
Recurring sporting events established in 1965
Drag racing events
Series